Nautilus Island is a privately owned island in Penobscot Bay, Maine. It is part of the Town of Brooksville, in Hancock County.

Overview
During the Revolutionary War the American vessel Hazard engaged the British sloop of war Nautilus off the island's shores and the island has been known as Nautilus ever since. It was captured from the British on July 26, 1779, by men of the Continental Marines commanded by Paul Revere as part of action undertaken by the Penobscot Expedition.

It has century-old buildings and tennis courts.

The island features in the opening of the famous poem "Skunk Hour" by Robert Lowell: "Nautilus Island's hermit /
heiress still lives through winter in her Spartan cottage; / her sheep still graze above the sea. / ... Thirsting for
the hierarchic privacy / of Queen Victoria's century, / she buys up all / the eyesores facing her shore, / and lets them fall."

See also
 List of islands of Maine
 Penobscot Expedition
 Penobscot Bay

References

External links
Official website

Islands of Hancock County, Maine
Islands of Maine
Coastal islands of Maine
Private islands of Maine